Paul Andrew Deas (born 22 February 1972) is a Scottish retired professional footballer.

A left-back, Deas began his career with Scottish Junior club Kinnoull before joining St Johnstone in 1990. In five years at McDiarmid Park he made 87 league appearances and scored two goals.

In 1995, he signed for Stirling Albion, with whom he remained for three years. He also went on to play for Livingston, Partick Thistle, Ross County and, most recently, Brechin City.

Deas represented the Scotland national under-21 football team.

Personal life
He is the uncle of Inverness Caledonian Thistle player Robbie Deas.

Honours
Livingston
Scottish First Division: 2000–01

References
Specific

General

Profile at PlayerHistory.com

1972 births
Living people
Footballers from Perth, Scotland
Scottish footballers
St Johnstone F.C. players
Stirling Albion F.C. players
Livingston F.C. players
Partick Thistle F.C. players
Ross County F.C. players
Brechin City F.C. players
Association football defenders
Scottish Football League players
Scotland under-21 international footballers
Kinnoull F.C. players
Scottish Junior Football Association players